Mista Don't Play: Everythangs Workin is the second studio album by American rapper Project Pat. It was released on February 27, 2001 via Loud and Hypnotize Minds with distribution via RED. Recording sessions took place at Hypnotize Minds Studio in Memphis, Tennessee. Production was handled by DJ Paul and Juicy J. Original official music videos were done for "Chickenhead" and "Don't Save Her". Over 10 years later, Project Pat released official music videos for "We Can Get Gangsta" and "Gorilla Pimp".

The album peaked at number 4 on the Billboard 200 in the United States, and was certified Gold by the Recording Industry Association of America on March 29, 2001.

Track listing

Charts

Weekly charts

Year-end charts

Certifications

References

External links

2001 albums
Project Pat albums
Loud Records albums
Albums produced by DJ Paul
Albums produced by Juicy J